is a railway station  is a passenger railway station in located in the city of  Matsusaka, Mie Prefecture, Japan, operated by Central Japan Railway Company (JR Tōkai).

Lines
Rokken Station is served by the Kisei Main Line, and is 29.1 rail kilometers from the terminus of the line at Kameyama Station.

Station layout
The station consists of two opposed side platforms connected by a footbridge.There is no station building, but only a small weather shelter built onto the platform.

Platforms

Adjacent stations 

|-
!colspan=5|Central Japan Railway Company (JR Central)

History
The Sangū Railway started service with its initial line between Tsu Station and Miyagawa Station on December 31, 1893. However, Rokken Station was not completed by that date, and only began operations on January 10, 1894. The line was nationalized on October 1, 1907, becoming the Sangu Line of the Japanese Government Railways (JGR) on October 12, 1909.

On October 15, 1956, a crash involving two passenger trains occurred at the station. The Rokken rail accident killed 42 people.
The station was transferred to the control of the Japan National Railways (JNR) Kisei Main Line on July 15, 1959. All freight operations were discontinued in 1962. The station has been unattended since December 21, 1983. The station was absorbed into the JR Central network upon the privatization of the JNR on April 1, 1987.

Passenger statistics
In fiscal 2019, the station was used by an average of 121 passengers daily (boarding passengers only).

Surrounding area
Matsusaka Municipal Mikumo Junior High School
Mie Prefecture Central Wholesale Market

See also
 List of railway stations in Japan

References

External links

 JR Central timetable 

Railway stations in Japan opened in 1894
Railway stations in Mie Prefecture
Matsusaka, Mie